Imtiaz Shahid Qureshi (born 10 April 1961) is a Pakistani politician hailing from Shakardara, Kohat District who served as Minister for Law, Parliamentary Affairs and Human Rights in the 10th Khyber Pakhtunkhwa Assembly. He also served as the committee member of The Khyber Pakhtunkhwa Police Bill, 2017, Committee on The Khyber Pakhtunkhwa Whistleblower Protection and Vigilance commission Bill and Right to Information. He also served as Deputy Speaker of Khyber Pakhtunkhwa Assembly.

External links

References

1961 births
Living people
Pashtun people
Khyber Pakhtunkhwa MPAs 2013–2018
People from Kohat District
Pakistan Tehreek-e-Insaf politicians
Deputy Speakers of the Provincial Assembly of Khyber Pakhtunkhwa